Joe Dumars III (born May 24, 1963) is an American professional basketball executive and former player who is the executive vice president and head of basketball operations of the National Basketball Association (NBA). He could play either shooting guard or point guard on offense and was a highly effective defender. He played his entire fourteen-year career with the Detroit Pistons. During the late 1980s and early 1990s, Dumars and Isiah Thomas combined to form one of the best backcourts in NBA history. Initially a shooting guard, Dumars moved to point guard following Thomas' retirement in 1994, sharing ball-handling duties with Grant Hill. Dumars was inducted into the Basketball Hall of Fame in 2006. Dumars served as the president of basketball operations for the Pistons from 2000 to 2014.

Early life
Dumars was born in Shreveport, Louisiana. Dumars' mother, Ophelia, was a custodian at Northwestern State University in Natchitoches while his father, Joe Dumars Jr. (Big Joe), was a truck driver.

Dumars grew up in an athletic family and he actually preferred football as a child, as all five of his brothers were defensive standouts at Natchitoches Central High School. His brother David later played professional football in the USFL. Dumars played defensive back on the football team until junior high school when a big hit on the field directed him toward basketball. His father built a hoop in the backyard, where Dumars would practice his jump shot.

Playing career
During his four years at McNeese State University, Dumars averaged 22.5 points per game, including 25.8 points per game as a senior – good for sixth in the nation. He finished his college career as the 11th leading scorer in NCAA history.

Drafted 18th overall in the first round of the 1985 NBA draft, he played guard for the Detroit Pistons for his entire career, from 1985 to 1999. He won two championships as a player in 1989 and 1990, and was voted the 1989 Finals MVP, averaging 27.3 points per game as the Pistons swept the Los Angeles Lakers in four games. The following year, he won accolades during the Eastern Conference Finals when, with Dennis Rodman, he was a cornerstone of coach Chuck Daly's "Jordan Rules" defensive playbook, which forced the Chicago Bulls to change their offensive strategy to include less of Michael Jordan and more of the other members of the team. According to Jordan, Dumars was the best defender he ever faced in the NBA.

In the 1990 NBA Finals against the Portland Trail Blazers, Dumars averaged 20.6 points, including 33 points in a pivotal Game 3 win that took place the same day his father had died. With his father's death imminent, Dumars had instructed his wife, Debbie, not to tell him any news about his condition until after the game. However, Debbie did tell Isiah Thomas, who told the rest of the team. After the game, Thomas spoke about an off-balance prayer Dumars tossed up that somehow went in the basket, saying his first thought was, "Your father put that one in, Joe."

During his career, he was selected to the All-Star team six times, and to the All-Defensive first team four times. In 14 seasons, all with the Pistons, Dumars scored 16,401 points, handed out 4,612 assists, grabbed 2,203 rebounds and recorded 902 steals.

Although he was a member of the famed "Bad Boys" teams known for their aggressive play and demeanor, he became personally known for his quiet and upstanding behavior. He was the first recipient of the NBA Sportsmanship Award which has been named the Joe Dumars Trophy.

His number 4 jersey was retired by the Pistons in March 2000. He has the distinction as being the only Pistons player to ever wear this number since moving to Detroit.

He played for the US national team in the 1994 FIBA World Championship, winning the gold medal.

NBA career statistics

Regular season

|-
| style="text-align:left;"|
| style="text-align:left;"|Detroit
| 82 || 45 || 23.9 || .481 || .313 || .798 || 1.5 || 4.8 || .8 || .1 || 9.4
|-
| style="text-align:left;"|
| style="text-align:left;"|Detroit
| 79 || 75 || 30.9 || .493 || .409 || .748 || 2.1 || 4.5 || 1.1 || .1 || 11.8
|-
| style="text-align:left;"|
| style="text-align:left;"|Detroit
| 82 || style="background:#cfecec;"|82* || 33.3 || .472 || .211 || .815 || 2.4 || 4.7 || 1.1 || .2 || 14.2
|-
| style="text-align:left; background:#afe6ba;"|†
| style="text-align:left;"|Detroit
| 69 || 67 || 34.9 || .505 || .483 || .850 || 2.5 || 5.7 || .9 || .1 || 17.2
|-
| style="text-align:left; background:#afe6ba;"|†
|style="text-align:left;"|Detroit
| 75 || 71 || 34.4 || .480 || .400 || .900 || 2.8 || 4.9 || .8 || .0 || 17.8
|-
| style="text-align:left;"|
| style="text-align:left;"|Detroit
| 80 || 80 || 38.1 || .481 || .311 || .890 || 2.3 || 5.5 || 1.1 || .1 || 20.4
|-
| style="text-align:left;"|
| style="text-align:left;"|Detroit
| 82 || style="background:#cfecec;"|82* || 38.9 || .448 || .408 || .867 || 2.3 || 4.6 || .9 || .1 || 19.9
|-
| style="text-align:left;"|
| style="text-align:left;"|Detroit
| 77 || 77 || 40.2 || .466 || .375 || .864 || 1.9 || 4.0 || 1.0 || .1 || 23.5
|-
| style="text-align:left;"|
| style="text-align:left;"|Detroit
| 69 || 69 || 37.6 || .452 || .388 || .836 || 2.2 || 3.8 || .9 || .1 || 20.4
|-
| style="text-align:left;"|
| style="text-align:left;"|Detroit
| 67 || 67 || 38.0 || .430 || .305 || .805 || 2.4 || 5.5 || 1.1 || .1 || 18.1
|-
| style="text-align:left;"|
| style="text-align:left;"|Detroit
| 67 || 40 || 32.7 || .426 || .406 || .822 || 2.1 || 4.0 || .6 || .0 || 11.8
|-
| style="text-align:left;"|
| style="text-align:left;"|Detroit
| 79 || 79 || 37.0 || .440 || .432 || .867 || 2.4 || 4.0 || .7 || .0 || 14.7
|-
| style="text-align:left;"|
| style="text-align:left;"|Detroit
| 72 || 72 || 32.3 || .416 || .371 || .825 || 1.4 || 3.5 || .6 || .0 || 13.1
|-
| style="text-align:left;"|
| style="text-align:left;"|Detroit
| 38 || 38 || 29.4 || .411 || .403 || .836 || 1.8 || 3.5 || .6 || .1 || 11.3
|- class="sortbottom"
| style="text-align:center;" colspan="2"|Career
| 1,018 || 944 || 34.5 || .460 || .382 || .843 || 2.2 || 4.5 || .9 || .1 || 16.1
|- class="sortbottom"
| style="text-align:center;" colspan="2"|All-Star
| 6 || 1 || 16.3 || .400 || .333 || .500 || 1.2 || 3.4 || .2 || .0 || 5.7

Playoffs

|-
| style="text-align:left;"|1986
| style="text-align:left;"|Detroit
| 4 || 4 || 36.8 || .610 ||  || .667 || 3.3 || 6.3 || 1.0 || .0 || 15.0
|-
| style="text-align:left;"|1987
| style="text-align:left;"|Detroit
| 15 || 15 || 31.5 || .538 || .667 || .780 || 1.3 || 4.8 || .8 || .1 || 12.7
|-
| style="text-align:left;"|1988
| style="text-align:left;"|Detroit
| 23 || 23 || 35.0 || .457 || .333 || .889 || 2.2 || 4.9 || .6 || .1 || 12.3
|-
| style="text-align:left; background:#afe6ba;"|1989†
| style="text-align:left;"|Detroit
| 17 || 17 || 36.5 || .455 || .083 || .861 || 2.6 || 5.6 || .7 || .1 || 17.6
|-
| style="text-align:left; background:#afe6ba;"|1990†
| style="text-align:left;"|Detroit
| 20 || 20 || 37.7 || .458 || .263 || .876 || 2.2 || 4.8 || 1.1 || .0 || 18.2
|-
| style="text-align:left;"|1991
| style="text-align:left;"|Detroit
| 15 || 15 || 39.2 || .429 || .405 || .845 || 3.3 || 4.1 || 1.1 || .1 || 20.6
|-
| style="text-align:left;"|1992
| style="text-align:left;"|Detroit
| 5 || 5 || 44.2 || .471 || .500 || .789 || 1.6 || 3.2 || 1.0 || .2 || 16.8
|-
| style="text-align:left;"|1996
| style="text-align:left;"|Detroit
| 3 || 3 || 41.0 || .457 || .357 || 1.000 || 4.3 || 3.7 || .0 || .0 || 13.7
|-
| style="text-align:left;"|1997
| style="text-align:left;"|Detroit
| 5 || 5 || 42.8 || .361 || .261 || .950 || 1.8 || 2.0 || 1.0 || .0 || 13.8
|-
| style="text-align:left;"|1999
| style="text-align:left;"|Detroit
| 5 || 5 || 30.6 || .487 || .526 || 1.000 || 1.4 || 2.6 || .4 || .0 || 10.2
|- class="sortbottom"
| style="text-align:center;" colspan="2"|Career
| 112 || 112 || 36.6 || .462 || .358 || .855 || 2.3 || 4.6 || .8 || .1 || 15.6

NBA executive career
Dumars became the Pistons' president of basketball operations prior to the start of the 2000–01 season. He was voted the league's Executive of the Year for the 2002–03 season and quietly went on to build the team that won the 2004 NBA championship. With the win, Dumars became the first African American executive to lead a team to an NBA championship. During the 2005–06 season, the Pistons had its best regular season record in franchise history (64–18). The Pistons made it to the Eastern Conference Finals six straight years (2003–2008) under Dumars' watch. This streak would come to an end in the 2008–09 season when the Pistons were swept in the first round by the Cleveland Cavaliers.

On February 9, 2014, Dumars fired Maurice Cheeks as head coach and appointed John Loyer as interim head coach. On April 14, 2014, the Pistons announced that Dumars would step down as president of basketball operations, yet remain as an advisor to the organization and its ownership team. During his 14 years as President, Dumars guided the organization to a 595–536 (.527) regular-season record, 73 playoff wins, six Eastern Conference Finals appearances (2003–08), six Central Division titles, two Eastern Conference Championships (2004 and 2005), and the 2004 NBA championship.

On June 21, 2019, Dumars was named special advisor to the general manager of the Sacramento Kings. On August 14, 2020, Dumars was named interim executive vice president of basketball operations. On September 17, 2020, he was named chief strategy officer.

On May 2, 2022, Dumars was named the executive vice president and head of basketball operations of the NBA.

Business interests
Dumars was majority owner as well as CEO and President of Detroit Technologies for approximately 10 years. Founded by Dumars in 1996, Detroit Technologies is an automotive supply company. He sold off his interest in the company in 2006 to pursue other business interests and focus on his role as Pistons' president of basketball operations.

Dumars was the founder and owner of the Joe Dumars Fieldhouse, an indoor sports and entertainment facility located in Shelby Township and Detroit. The Shelby Township location permanently closed in August 2020 due to the COVID-19 pandemic, with the original location in Detroit closing in May of 2022.

In August 2017, Dumars joined Independent Sports & Entertainment, an integrated sports, media and entertainment management agency, as president of its basketball division.

See also
 List of NCAA Division I men's basketball career free throw scoring leaders
 Michigan Sports Hall of Fame

References

External links
 
 
 Dumars historical biography

1963 births
Living people
1994 FIBA World Championship players
African-American basketball players
African-American sports executives and administrators
American men's basketball players
American sports executives and administrators
Basketball players from Detroit
Basketball players from Shreveport, Louisiana
Detroit Pistons draft picks
Detroit Pistons executives
Detroit Pistons players
FIBA World Championship-winning players
McNeese Cowboys basketball players
Naismith Memorial Basketball Hall of Fame inductees
Natchitoches Central High School alumni
National Basketball Association All-Stars
National Basketball Association executives
National Basketball Association general managers
National Basketball Association players with retired numbers
Shooting guards
United States men's national basketball team players
21st-century African-American people
20th-century African-American sportspeople